Events in the year 2023 in Djibouti.

Incumbents 

 President: Ismaïl Omar Guelleh
 Prime Minister: Abdoulkader Kamil Mohamed

Events 
Ongoing — COVID-19 pandemic in Djibouti

 February – 2023 Djiboutian parliamentary election

Sports 

 2022–23 Djibouti Premier League

References 

 
Djibouti
Djibouti
2020s in Djibouti
Years of the 21st century in Djibouti